Tetracha is a genus of metallic tiger beetles in the family Cicindelidae, formerly treated as a subgenus within the genus Megacephala. Tetracha species are exclusively New World in distribution, while Megacephala are exclusively Old World in distribution. There are ~100 described species in Tetracha.

Species

 Tetracha acutipennis (Dejean, 1825) c g
 Tetracha affinis (Dejean, 1825) i c g
 Tetracha angustata (Chevrolat, 1841) i c g
 Tetracha angusticollis W.Horn, 1896 c g
 Tetracha annuligera Lucas, 1857 c g
 Tetracha aptera Chaudoir, 1862 c g
 Tetracha biimpressicollis (Mandl, 1960) c g
 Tetracha bilunata (Klug, 1834) c g
 Tetracha bolivari Naviaux, 2007 c g
 Tetracha brasiliensis (Kirby, 1819) c g
 Tetracha brevis Naviaux, 2007 c g
 Tetracha brevisulcata (W.Horn, 1907) c g
 Tetracha brzoskai Naviaux, 2007 c g
 Tetracha buchardi Naviaux, 2007 c g
 Tetracha camposi W.Horn, 1900 c g
 Tetracha carolina (Linnaeus, 1763) i c g b (Carolina metallic tiger beetle)
 Tetracha cassolai Naviaux, 2007 c g
 Tetracha chacoensis (Sawada & Wiesner, 1997) c g
 Tetracha chilensis (Laporte, 1834) c g
 Tetracha coerulea Lucas, 1857 c g
 Tetracha confusa Chaudoir, 1865 c g
 Tetracha cribrata Steinheil, 1875 c g
 Tetracha cyanea (W.Horn, 1905) c g
 Tetracha cyanides Bates, 1881 c g
 Tetracha davidsoni Naviaux, 2007 c g
 Tetracha deuvei Naviaux, 2007 c g
 Tetracha dheurlei Naviaux, 2007 c g
 Tetracha distinguenda (Dejean, 1831) c g
 Tetracha ensenada R.Huber, 1994 c g (Ensenada metallic tiger beetle)
 Tetracha erichsoni W.Horn, 1892 c g
 Tetracha erwini Naviaux, 2010 c g
 Tetracha femoralis (Perty, 1830) c g
 Tetracha flammula (W.Horn, 1905) c g
 Tetracha floridana Leng & Mutchler, 1916 i c g b (Florida metallic tiger beetle)
 Tetracha foucarti Naviaux & Richoux, 2006 c g
 Tetracha frederici Naviaux, 2007 c g
 Tetracha fulgida (Klug, 1834) c g
 Tetracha genieri Naviaux, 2007 c g
 Tetracha germaini Chaudoir, 1865 c g
 Tetracha globosicollis (W.Horn, 1913) c g
 Tetracha gracilis (Reiche, 1842) c g
 Tetracha horni Ruge, 1892 c g
 Tetracha huberi (Johnson, 1991) c g
 Tetracha huedepohli (Mandl, 1974) c g
 Tetracha immaculipennis Lucas, 1857 c g
 Tetracha impressa (Chevrolat, 1841) i c g b (upland metallic tiger beetle)
 Tetracha inca Naviaux & Ugarte-Peña, 2006 c g
 Tetracha insignis Chaudoir, 1850 c g
 Tetracha klagesi W.Horn, 1903 c g
 Tetracha lacordairei (Gory, 1833) c g
 Tetracha lafertei J.Thomson, 1857 c g
 Tetracha lanei (Mandl, 1961) c g
 Tetracha lateralis W.Horn, 1905 c g
 Tetracha latreillei (Laporte, 1834) c g
 Tetracha longipennis Chaudoir, 1865 c g
 Tetracha lucifera (Erichson, 1847) c g
 Tetracha magdalenae Dheurle, 2017
 Tetracha martii (Perty, 1830) c g
 Tetracha mellyi Chaudoir, 1850 c g
 Tetracha misella Naviaux, 2007 c g
 Tetracha mniszechi J.Thomson, 1857 c g
 Tetracha naviauxi Ward; Davidson & Brzoska, 2011 c g
 Tetracha nicaraguensis (Johnson, 1993) c g
 Tetracha onorei Naviaux, 2007 c g
 Tetracha orbignyi Naviaux, 2007 c g
 Tetracha ovata Naviaux, 2007 c g
 Tetracha oxychiliformis (W.Horn, 1905) c g
 Tetracha panamensis (Johnson, 1991) c g
 Tetracha parallela Naviaux, 2010 c g
 Tetracha pearsoni Naviaux, 2007 c g
 Tetracha pierrei Naviaux, 2007 c g
 Tetracha pilosipennis (Mandl, 1958) c g
 Tetracha polita Naviaux, 2007 c g
 Tetracha prolongata (W.Horn, 1932) c g
 Tetracha pseudodistinguenda (W.Horn, 1905) c g
 Tetracha pseudofulgida (Mandl, 1963) c g
 Tetracha pseudosobrina (W.Horn, 1905) c g
 Tetracha quadrata Naviaux, 2007 c g
 Tetracha rawlinsi Davidson & Naviaux, 2006 c g
 Tetracha rosalinae Naviaux, 2007 c g
 Tetracha ruth (W.Horn, 1907) c g
 Tetracha rutilans J.Thomson, 1857 c g
 Tetracha sericea Naviaux, 2007 c g
 Tetracha sinaloa Huber & Shetterly, 2019
 Tetracha smaragdina J.Thomson, 1857 c g
 Tetracha sobrina (Dejean, 1831) i c g
 Tetracha sommeri Chaudoir, 1850 c g
 Tetracha speciosa Chaudoir, 1860 c g
 Tetracha spinosa (Brullé, 1837) c g
 Tetracha spixii (Brullé, 1837) c g
 Tetracha sumptuosa Dheurle, 2018
 Tetracha suturalis W.Horn, 1900 c g
 Tetracha thomsoniana W.Horn, 1915 c g
 Tetracha uhligi Naviaux, 2007 c g
 Tetracha vandenberghei Naviaux, 2007 c g
 Tetracha venezolana Naviaux, 2007 c g
 Tetracha virginica (Linnaeus, 1767) i c g b (Virginia metallic tiger beetle)
 Tetracha wardi Naviaux, 2007 c g
 Tetracha wiesneri Naviaux, 2007 c g
 Tetracha zerchei Naviaux, 2007 c g

Data sources: i = ITIS, c = Catalogue of Life, g = GBIF, b = Bugguide.net

References

 Biolib

Further reading

 
 

Cicindelidae